Orthogonius thoracicus is a species of ground beetle in the subfamily Orthogoniinae. It was described by Gestro in 1875.

References

thoracicus
Beetles described in 1875